Krishnapal Singh was an Indian politician.  He was elected to the Lok Sabha, the lower house of the Parliament of India from the Jalesar, Uttar Pradesh  as a member of the Swatantra Party.

References

External links
 Official biographical sketch in Parliament of India website

1899 births
Bharatiya Jana Sangh politicians
Hindu Mahasabha politicians
Akhil Bharatiya Ram Rajya Parishad politicians
Swatantra Party politicians
Year of death missing
India MPs 1962–1967
Lok Sabha members from Uttar Pradesh
Members of the Uttar Pradesh Legislative Council
Mayo College alumni